This is a list of all matches of the Japan national rugby union team.

Legend

Overall 
Japan's overall Test match record against all nations, updated to 20 November 2021, is as follows:

1930s

1950s

1960s

1970s

1980s

1990s

2000s

2010-2014

2015-2019

2020s

References

  
Japan